Peter Maslo (born 2 February 1987) is a Slovak football defender who currently plays for the Poprad.

References

External links
 
 Maslo at mfkruzomberok.sk 

1987 births
Living people
Slovak footballers
Association football defenders
MFK Ružomberok players
Bruk-Bet Termalica Nieciecza players
FK Poprad players
Slovak Super Liga players
Expatriate footballers in Poland
People from Trstená
Sportspeople from the Žilina Region
2. Liga (Slovakia) players